Rocky Ridge Farm Historic District is a national historic district located at Chapel Hill, Orange County, North Carolina.  The district encompasses 51 contributing buildings, 3 contributing sites, and 5 contributing structures in a predominantly residential section of Chapel Hill.  The district developed in two periods, 1928-1930 and 1936–1960, and includes notable examples of Colonial Revival, Tudor Revival, and International Style architecture.

It was listed on the National Register of Historic Places in 1989, with a boundary increase in 2008.

References

Houses on the National Register of Historic Places in North Carolina
Historic districts on the National Register of Historic Places in North Carolina
Colonial Revival architecture in North Carolina
Tudor Revival architecture in North Carolina
International style architecture in North Carolina
Buildings and structures in Chapel Hill-Carrboro, North Carolina
National Register of Historic Places in Orange County, North Carolina
Houses in Orange County, North Carolina